Concord Township is one of fifteen townships in DeKalb County, Indiana, United States. As of the 2010 census, its population was 1,335 and it contained 497 housing units.

History
Concord Township was originally called Dekalb Township, and under the latter name was organized in 1837.

Geography

Incorporated towns
 Saint Joe

Unincorporated towns
 Concord
 Orangeville

(This list is based on USGS data and may include former settlements.)

Adjacent townships
 Wilmington Township (north)
 Stafford Township (northeast)
 Newville Township (east)
 Spencer Township (south)
 Jackson Township (west)
 Union Township (west)

Major highways
  Indiana State Road 1
  Indiana State Road 8
  Indiana State Road 101

Cemeteries
The township contains three cemeteries: Alton, Concord, and Jenkins.

References
 
 United States Census Bureau cartographic boundary files

External links

Townships in DeKalb County, Indiana
Townships in Indiana
1837 establishments in Indiana
Populated places established in 1837